This is a list of feminist bookstores.

Canada 

 Common Woman Books
 Toronto Women's Bookstore

United States 

 Amazon Bookstore Cooperative
 Bloodroot
 Bluestockings
 Charis Books & More
 In Other Words Feminist Community Center
 Old Wives Tales
 A Room of One's Own
 Womanbooks
 A Woman's Place
 Women & Children First

United Kingdom 
 The Second Shelf in London
 Silver Moon Bookshop

See also 
 List of bookstore chains
 List of independent bookstores

References

Feminist

Bookstores